Kyparissia is a village in southwestern Arcadia, in the Peloponnese peninsula of continental Greece.
 
It is part of the municipal unit of Gortyna. In 2011 Kyparissia had a population of 58. It is situated near the left bank of the river Alfeios. 1 km south of Mavria, 3 km east of Kourounios, 3 km northeast of Isoma Karyon, 3 km west of Katsimpalis, 5 km southeast of Karytaina and 8 km northwest of Megalopoli. There are lignite mines east of the village.

History and remains 
The town lay in Achaea (Roman province) and after split in the Late Roman province of Peloponnesus Secundus.

The ancient city Trapezus was situated near the village.

To the east of the modern village lay the ancient town of Basilis (Βασιλίς), which had largely vanished by the 2nd century AD, when the geographer Pausanias recorded that only the sanctuary of hunting goddess Artemis survived. The site is now being excavated.

Population

Notable locals 
 Michalis Katsaros (1923-1998), poet

See also 
 List of settlements in Arcadia

References

Sources and external links 
 History and Information about Kyparissia
 GCatholic - Ciparissia, with (titular) incumbent bios
 Kyparissia on the GTP Travel Pages
 Raymond Janin, lemma 'Cyparissia', in Dictionnaire d'Histoire et de Géographie ecclésiastiques, vol. XIII, Paris 1956, coll. 1147-1148

Gortyna, Arcadia
Populated places in Arcadia, Peloponnese